Leo of Inis Airc was an early Medieval Irish Christian saint.

Biography

Inishark lies south-west of Inishbofin, Galway and was inhabited up to 1960. Leo is the patron saint of the island, and responsible for perhaps the first Christian settlement on the island. He lived in the 7th century.

The church he founded, now in ruins, is called Teampaill Leo, featuring a stone cross, Leac Leo. On the nearby south shore is Uaimh Leo, a cave where he is said to have prayed and meditated. Clochán Leo is a ruined structure said to have been his residence.

A 19th-century church was erected on the site of his Monastery.

His feast day was originally 11 April but later celebrated on 10 November.

See also

 Gormgal, died 1017/1018.
 Guairim of Inisbofin
 Colmán of Lindisfarne (c. 605–18 February 675)
 Féchín of Fore (d. 665).

References

 Inisbofin:Guide to the Natural History & Archaeology, Dave Hogan and Michael Gibbons.
 A Guide to Connemara's Early Christian Sites, Anthony Previté, Oughterard, 2008. 

People from County Galway
7th-century Irish priests